The Guangdong–Hong Kong Cup is a football competition between two teams representing Hong Kong and Guangdong Province of China respectively. It was established in 1979.

History
In April 1977, the Guangdong team visited Hong Kong for the first time and played two friendly matches. Within its staying period, the officials of Guangdong and Hong Kong football started a discussion on the possibility of establishing an annual competition between them.

In June 1978, the Hong Kong national football team visited China and finished its trip with a match against the Guangdong team. HKFA chairman Mr. Hui Chun Fui and the official in Guangdong then reached a basic agreement of having a competition between the teams again next year.

On 7 December 1978, the contract of establishing Guangdong–Hong Kong Cup was signed. The first competition started on 21 January 1979.

Milestones
 1979 (1st) – The first Guangdong–Hong Kong Cup concluded with the Guangdong team winning 4–1.
 1982 (4th) – The first time Hong Kong's team included foreign players. Extra time was the first used to decide the winner.
 1983 (5th) – The first time the result was decided by penalty shootout.
 1989 (11th) – The Hong Kong team came back from a 3-goal deficit win 4–3 and ended six consecutive wins for Guangdong.
 1990 (12th) – The first Hong Kong consecutive victory.
 1993 (15th) – Ross Greer's goal at 1:48 was the quickest goal in the competition's history.
 1994 (16th) – The Chinese Jia A League was established. For the first time, Guangdong team included players from outside Guangdong (Xu Hong, Fan Zhiyi and Su Maozhen). Fan Zhiyi was sent off during extra time of the second match. He was the first player to be sent off in the competition's history.
 1995 (17th) – The rule of "registering a maximum of 4 foreign players, a maximum of 3 players used" was established.
 1999 (21st) – No maximum limit of foreign players to be used in the competition was established.
 2003 (25th) – Each team was allowed to register a maximum of 5 foreign players, among which only 3 could be played in the match at the same time.
 2007 (29th) – The Guangdong match was played in Panyu Fo Ying Dong Stadium in remembrance of the death of Henry Fok, who established the Cup in 1979; Panyu is the home town of Mr. Fok.

Format
The competition is played every year. It is a two-leg competition where each team plays a home match once. The champion is decided by combining the results of both games.

Past winners

Winners table

References

External links
China - Interport matches: Hong Kong vs Guangdong at RSSSF 

 
1979 establishments in China
1979 establishments in Hong Kong
Football cup competitions in Hong Kong
Football cup competitions in China
Recurring sporting events established in 1979
Annual sporting events